Hesari-ye Gazerani (also Romanized as Ḩeşārī-ye Gāzerānī; also known as Ḩeşārī and Ḩeşār) is a village in Azari Rural District, in the Central District of Esfarayen County, North Khorasan Province, Iran. At the 2006 census, its population was 381, in 98 families.

References 

Populated places in Esfarayen County